Pentti Kustaa Nikula (born 3 February 1939) is a retired Finnish pole vaulter. He won the 1962 European Championships and held one world and four European outdoor records. He placed seventh at the 1964 Summer Olympics.

See also
Men's pole vault world record progression
Men's pole vault indoor world record progression

References

1939 births
Living people
People from Somero
Athletes (track and field) at the 1964 Summer Olympics
Olympic athletes of Finland
Finnish male pole vaulters
European Athletics Championships medalists
Sportspeople from Southwest Finland